The Tour of Hong Kong Shanghai was a professional cycling race held annually in Hong Kong. It was part of UCI Asia Tour in category 2.2.

Winners

References

UCI Asia Tour races
Cycle races in Hong Kong
Recurring sporting events established in 2006
Recurring sporting events disestablished in 2008
Defunct cycling races in China
2006 establishments in Hong Kong
2008 disestablishments in Hong Kong